CRW can be:

 Yeager Airport in Charleston, West Virginia (IATA Code: CRW)
 Continuous-rod warhead
 Raw image format extension for Canon Raw Format
 Canard Rotor/Wing, an aircraft configuration used by the Boeing X-50 Dragonfly
 Crawley railway station station code
 Canopy relative work skydiving discipline